Banco may refer to:

Places
 Banc (Barcelona Metro), also called Banco, a closed metro stop on the Barcelona metro
 Banco, Virginia, an unincorporated community
 Banco, West Virginia, an unincorporated community
 Banco National Park,  a national park in Côte d'Ivoire
 Banko, Guinea, a town and sub-prefecture in the Dabola Prefecture in the Faranah Region
 Banko, Mali, a rural commune and village in the Cercle of Dioïla in the Koulikoro Region
 Banko, a town in the Sekyere Kumawu district og Ghaba

Arts and architecture
 Banco (Banco del Mutuo Soccorso album), 1975 album by Italian progressive rock band Banco del Mutuo Soccorso
 Banco (Sir Michael Rocks album), 2014 album by American rapper Sir Michael Rocks
 Banco (novel), 1972 autobiography by Henri Charrière
 Banco architecture, a West African type of mudbrick, and the architecture made with it
 Banco (building material); fermented mud; made by fermenting mud with rice husks
 Banco (typeface), a decorative typeface
 Banko ware, a type of Japanese ceramics.
 Banco, an alternate Spanish spelling of bangka (boat) of the Philippines
 Banco, another name for the parlor game Bunco
 Banco, part of the nomenclature of the game known commonly as Baccarat

Other
 Banco, a historical reference to the Bank of Sweden and Swedish coinage

See also
 Banc